S.W. Randall Toyes and Giftes is a toy store which was established in 1970.  It is a specialty toy and gift shop with headquarters located in downtown Pittsburgh, selling old-fashioned, idiosyncratic, and nostalgic toys, along with modern toys. The store has been a local landmark since 1970, and "is a Pittsburgh tradition". It is Pittsburgh's largest specialty toy store, and with a half century of service it is the city's oldest surviving toy business.

History

Jack Cohen and his wife founded the original store in 1970 in the Squirrel Hill neighborhood, when Jack was 23 years old and working as an ice cream truck driver. They named it after their children Sherry, Stacey, Wendy, and James (middle name Randall). As of 2019, the Cohens still work for the company and it remains a family-run business.  Specializing in quirky products that "nobody else has", the store has earned Jack Cohen the sobriquet of "The Toy Keeper".

The stores have been a Pittsburgh landmark and tourist attraction since 1970, and it sells classic toys. 

As of 2019, there are three stores: Shadyside, Squirrel Hill, and Downtown Pittsburgh which is the flagship location. There were seven stores at the apogee of the company's growth. The company is privately held but according to a 2009 report, the business stocked 30,000 different items, had revenues of $2.5 million and employed 28 people. The company is a member of the American Specialty Toy Retailing Association.

During the 2011 filming of The Dark Knight Rises in Pittsburgh, the store received a boost in sales of older nostalgia Batman items; customers included Christopher Nolan, the film's director, who said he "loved the store". The downtown shop is often a stop on "Haunted Pittsburgh" tours; the third floor reportedly hosts apparitions.

References

Notes

Citations

Bibliography

External links 
 
 Nick Tomarello and Cole D'Alicandro (October 27, 2018) S.W. Randall Toyes and Giftes, interview of Jack Cohen Video via YouTube

1970 establishments in Pennsylvania
Companies based in Pittsburgh
Reportedly haunted locations in Pennsylvania
Retail companies established in 1970
Toy retailers of the United States
Tourist attractions in Pittsburgh
Toy industry